The common cicadabird (Edolisoma tenuirostre), also known as the slender-billed cicadabird, is a species of bird in the family Campephagidae.  It is found in Australia, Indonesia, New Guinea, and the Solomon Islands. Its natural habitats are temperate forest and subtropical or tropical moist lowland forest. The species is placed in the reinstated genus Edolisoma by most authors. The common cicadabird was described as a "great speciator" by Mayr & Diamond (2001); and Pedersen et al. (2018) described how this species rapidly colonized and diversified across the Indo-Pacific island region and Australia in the Pleistocene.

Subspecies
Numerous subspecies have been described; the list below is sorted taxonomically:

E. t. edithae Stresseman, 1932 - southern Sulawesi
E. t. pererratum Hartert, E., 1918 - Tukangbesi Islands, Indonesia
E. t. kalaotuae Meise, 1929 - Kalaotoa in the Selayar Islands, Indonesia
E. t. emancipatum Hartert, E., 1918 - Banggai Island, Indonesia
E. t. grayi Salvadori, 1879 - Morotai to Bacan in the northern Maluku Islands, Indonesia
E. t. obiense Salvadori, 1879 - Obi Islands, Indonesia
E. t. amboiense (Hartlaub, 1865) - Buru, Ambon, Seram, and other Seram Sea islands, Indonesia
E. t. matthiae Sibley, 1946 - Mussau and Emirau, Papua New Guinea
E. t. heinrothi Stresseman, 1922 - New Britain and Lolobau, Papua New Guinea
E. t. rooki Rothschild & Hartert, E., 1914 - Umboi, Papua New Guinea
E. t. nehrkorni Salvadori, 1890 - Waigeo, western New Guinea
E. t. numforanum (Peters, J.L. & Mayr, 1960) - Numfor, western New Guinea
E. t. meyerii Salvadori, 1878 - Biak, western New Guinea
E. t. aruense Sharpe, 1878 - southwestern and south-central New Guinea and the Aru Islands
E. t. muellerii Salvadori, 1876 - most of New Guinea (aside from the south), Kofiau & Misool, Long, Sakar, and the D'Entrecasteaux Islands
E. t. tagulanum Hartert, E., 1898 - Misima and Tagula, Papua New Guinea
E. t. rostratum Hartert, E., 1898 - Rossel, Papua New Guinea
E. t. melvillense (Mathews, 1912) - northern Australia from northeastern Western Australia to the Cape York Peninsula, south to northeast Queensland
E. t. tenuirostre (Jardine, 1831) - eastern Australia from east-central Queensland south to southeast Victoria
The former subspecies E. t. nisorium was found to be of erroneous placement and to actually belong to the grey-capped cicadabird (E. remotum), and was thus moved to it by the International Ornithological Congress in 2022.

Gallery

References

External links 
 ABID Images
 On the HBW Internet Bird Collection
 Species factsheet  - BirdLife International

common cicadabird
Birds of Australia
Birds of the Maluku Islands
Birds of New Guinea
common cicadabird
Articles containing video clips
Taxonomy articles created by Polbot